Jake Galea (born 15 April 1996) is a Maltese footballer who plays as a goalkeeper for Etzella Ettelbruck and the Malta national team.

Career
Galea made his international debut for Malta on 7 October 2020 in a friendly match against Gibraltar.

In 2022, he signed for Luxembourgish side Etzella Ettelbruck, becoming the first Maltese player in Luxembourg.

Career statistics

International

References

External links
 
 

1996 births
Living people
Maltese footballers
Malta youth international footballers
Malta under-21 international footballers
Malta international footballers
Association football goalkeepers
St. Andrews F.C. players
Ħamrun Spartans F.C. players
Sliema Wanderers F.C. players
Maltese Premier League players